Leopold Leonhard Raymund Count of Thun and Hohenstein (17 April 1748 in Tetschen in the castle of Tetschen – 22 October 1826 at Cibulka castle near Körbern, now Prague-Košíře) was the 73rd Bishop of Passau and the last Prince-Bishop of Passau.

Life
Leopold Leonhard was the youngest of twelve children from the first marriage of Johann Joseph Count von Thun and Hohenstein with Maria Christiana Countess of Hohenzollern and Hechingen.

Thun had been a canonist in Passau since 1768 and received priest ordination in Leitmeritz on 10 September 1771. In 1787 he became a cathedral capitular in Passau. In 1795 he was appointed a Dompropst, and on 29 May 1796 he became auxiliary bishop and vicar general.

After the death of his cousin, the prince-bishop Thomas Johann Graf von Thun and Hohenstein, he was elected by the chapter of the cathedral on 13 December 1796 as his successor. The papal confirmation followed on 24 July 1797. On 27 August 1797 he received the ordination of bishops through Seckauer Prince Bishop Joseph Adam Count of Arco in the Passau Cathedral.

When, on 22 February 1803, the Hochstift Passau, the secular dominion of the diocese, was abolished by the Reichsdeputationshauptschluss and divided between the electorate of Salzburg and the electorate of Bavaria, Thun left the controversy with Bavarian Minister Montgelas Passau in June 1803 and did not return,

He refused to acknowledge the changes that had occurred. Thun handed over the business powers to his general vicar, Count Auersperg, and the clergy, the episcopal functions to his auxiliary bishop, Karl Kajetan von Gaisruck. In 1804 he let himself be dispensed with his residence. As General Vicar Auersperg Passau also left 1806, confused administrative conditions prevailed.

Tomb of Leopold Leonhard at the Kleinseitner cemetery in Prague. Built by Václav Prachner.
Leopold Leonhard Count von Thun and Hohenstein lived up to his death on his property in Cibulka near Prague, the business in the bishopric of Passau took the spiritual council. In 1818 Archbishop Gaisruck went to Milan as an archbishop, which meant that no pontifical trials had taken place until 1824 in Passau. Thun offered his resignation to the Holy See in 1819, but he was not accepted. After his death, he was buried in Koschir near Prague.

References

1748 births
1826 deaths
Roman Catholic bishops of Passau